"Bury My Body" is a traditional gospel blues song. It is also known as "(Lord) I Don't Care Where Dey (They, You) Bury My Body" and "My Soul Is Gonna Live with God".

The origins of the song are obscure. The earliest recording may be by the Norfolk Jazz and Jubilee Quartets, as "Lord, I Don't Care Where They Bury My Body", in 192729. The various titles are taken from the chorus: "Bury my body, Lord, I don't care where; for my soul is gonna live with God".

As is common with traditional songs, the words vary between performers. The verses sometimes seem to refer to the miracle of the empty tomb; at others to the rapture; at yet others to the singer's indifference to the manner of disposal of his or her remains, as a small matter compared with salvation.

Recordings 
The following recordings are by artists with Wikipedia articles:
 1937"I Don't Care Where You Bury My Body" by Mitchell's Christian Singers
 1940"I Don't Care Where Dey Bury My Body" by Joshua White and his Carolinians
 1954Lonnie Donegan, on the 45 rpm EP Decca DFE 6345. This version is sometimes erroneously credited to Chris Barber, who played on the recording as a backing musician 
 1964The Animals on the album The Animals 
 196566The Misunderstood
 1970Al Kooper and Shuggie Otis on the album Kooper Session: Super Session, Vol. 2 
 1977"I Don't Care Where You Bury My Body" by Ella Jenkins on the album Songs, Rhythms and Chants for the Dance 
 1991Davy Graham on the album Playing In Traffic 
 2001The Starlite Desperation on the album Show You What a Baby Won't 
 2005Chris Barber on the album The Grand Reunion Concert 
 2012Robert Plant on the album Sensational Space Shifters (Live in London July '12)
 2013The 77s on Gimme a Kickstart ... And a Phrase Or Two

Other uses

Songs 
The following songs are unrelated to the main subject of this article, and to each other, despite having related titles:
 1993"Bury My Body" by John Lee Hooker, a blues song on the album Nothing But the Blues 
 2006"I Dont Care Where I Go When I Die", a grindcore song on the album of the same name by Gaza
 2014"Bury My Body" by Fishboy on the album An Elephant

Albums 
Bury My Body may refer to several compilation albums of songs by various artists, unrelated to the main subject of this article.
 2006Bury My Body 
 2012Bury My Body, Vol. 1 
 2012 Bury My Body, Vol. 2

References

Gospel songs
The Animals songs
Lonnie Donegan songs
John Lee Hooker songs
Year of song unknown
Songwriter unknown